Jacques Joubert (born March 23, 1971) is an American former professional ice hockey center who was an All-American for Boston University.

Career
Joubert's college career began at Princeton University in 1990. The year turned out poorly for him as he scored just 2 goals in 13 games and left the program in the middle of the year and return to juniors. After sitting out the following year, per NCAA transfer rules, Joubert made his debut for Boston University and was far more productive, notching 35 points and making himself enough of a commodity for the Dallas Stars to select him in the NHL Supplemental Draft.

Joubert continued his upward trend as a junior, finishing second on the Terriers in scoring and earned a spot on the second All-American team. He helped BU produce a fantastic season, winning both Hockey East championships and earn the top eastern seed at the NCAA Tournament. The Terriers handled their first two games with aplomb and reached the championship game. In a fairly surprising turn of events, Boston University was completely overwhelmed by underdog Lake Superior State and suffered the worst championship loss since 1961.

Joubert was named team captain for his senior season and responded with his best performance yet. While he failed to make the All-American squad, he tied for the team lead in goals and led the Terriers to a second straight 30+ win season. BU tied for the regular season championship with Maine but were able to were able to capture their second consecutive Hockey East Championship. Armed with the top eastern seed yet again, BU's offense dominated in the quarter- and semifinals, propelling the Terriers to the championship once more. This time, Joubert's team had to get past Maine, a team they had failed to defeat in four games that season. Boston University managed to score the only goal in the first period and began to take over the game in the second. Joubert's final college goal came on the power play at the midway point of the game and turned out to be the game-winner. Maine cut into the Terriers lead with a pair of goals but a big third period enabled the Terriers to win the game 6–2.

After graduating, Joubert began his professional career with a good season for the Peoria Rivermen. His scoring declined in year two as he split time between two leagues. By the beginning of 1997, he found himself further away from the NHL than he wanted and ended up spending much of next three years playing in Europe. He retired in 2000.

Joubert was inducted into the Boston University athletic Hall of Fame in 2010.

Statistics

Regular season and playoffs

Awards and honors

References

External links

1971 births
Living people
AHCA Division I men's ice hockey All-Americans
American men's ice hockey centers
Ice hockey people from Indiana
Sportspeople from South Bend, Indiana
Princeton Tigers men's ice hockey players
North Iowa Huskies players
Boston University Terriers men's ice hockey players
Peoria Rivermen (IHL) players
Rochester Americans players
Milwaukee Admirals players
EC Graz players
Tallahassee Tiger Sharks players
Heilbronner Falken players
Dallas Stars draft picks
National Hockey League supplemental draft picks
NCAA men's ice hockey national champions